The 2000–01 Ranji Trophy was the 67th season of the Ranji Trophy. Baroda won their first title in 44 years beating Railways by 21 runs in the final. Baroda conceded a first innings lead of 151 runs, but Railways were bowled out in the second innings by Zaheer Khan who took five wickets for 43 runs.

Zonal stage
Central Zone

  Top three teams advanced to the knockout stage.

East Zone

  Top three teams advanced to the knockout stage.

North Zone

  Top three teams advanced to the knockout stage.

West Zone

  Top three teams advanced to the knockout stage.

South Zone

  Top three teams advanced to the knockout stage.

Knockout stage
The draw for the quarter-finals were made after the final zonal-stage match, with the following fixtures announced. The fixtures in the knockout stage of the tournament are played across five days, instead of four days in the zonal stage.

Final

Scorecards and averages
Cricketarchive

Notes

Footnotes

References

External links

Ranji Trophy
Ranji Trophy seasons
Ranji Trophy